Norman 'Snowy' McIntosh (3 March 1890 – 11 March 1965) was an Australian rules footballer who played in the VFL between 1920 and 1924 for the Richmond Football Club.

Recruited from South Fremantle, where he had played for ten seasons including the 1916 and 1917 premiership teams, McIntosh was Richmond's first major recruit from Western Australia.

After leaving the Tigers he was Captain/Coach of Rupanyup in rural Victoria for one season before returning to Western Australia where he was Captain/Coach of Claremont from 1926 to 1927 and non-playing coach of the Bulldogs in 1929 and again in 1933.

References
Hogan P: The Tigers Of Old, Richmond FC, Melbourne 1996

External links

South Fremantle Football Club players
Richmond Football Club players
Richmond Football Club Premiership players
Claremont Football Club players
Claremont Football Club coaches
South Fremantle Football Club coaches
Rupanyup Football Club players
Australian rules footballers from Western Australia
1890 births
1965 deaths
One-time VFL/AFL Premiership players